West Virginia Panhandle may refer to:

Eastern Panhandle of West Virginia, a region bordering Maryland and Virginia
Northern Panhandle of West Virginia, a smaller region bordering Ohio and Pennsylvania